Filipp Provorkov (born 15 April 1988) is an Estonian swimmer. He competed in the men's 50 metre breaststroke event at the 2017 World Aquatics Championships.

References

External links
 
Filipp Provorkov at ESBL

1988 births
Living people
Estonian male breaststroke swimmers
Swimmers from Tallinn
21st-century Estonian people